CBS Rochester may refer to:

WROC-TV in Rochester, New York
KIMT in Rochester, Minnesota